Ferroni is an Italian surname. Notable people with the surname include:

Egisto Ferroni (1835–1912), Italian painter
Giorgio Ferroni (1908-1981), Italian film director, film editor and screenwriter
Giovanni Tommasi Ferroni (born 1967), Italian magic realism artist specializing in fantasy painting
Nicole Ferroni (born 1982), French comedian, actress, columnist in France Inter and former biology teacher

See also
Palazzo Spini-Ferroni, Florence

Italian-language surnames